Duane A. Davidson (born June 6, 1959) is an American accountant and politician who served as the 23rd Washington State Treasurer from 2017 to 2021. He is a member of the Republican Party.

Early life and education

Davidson was born and raised in the Snoqualmie Valley near the town of Carnation, Washington, into a family involved in dairy farming, logging and other small businesses. He graduated from Tolt High School, in Carnation. He attended Bellevue Community College before earning a Bachelor of Science degree in accounting from Central Washington University in Ellensburg, Washington.

Career

Davidson is an actively-licensed certified public accountant (CPA). He was elected to four terms as Treasurer of Benton County, Washington. He took that office following his initial election in 2003. During Davidson's tenure as Benton County Treasurer, available public documents show that total outstanding year-end debt dropped from $24.4 million as of December 31, 2012  to $12.6 million as of December 31, 2016.

Immediately prior to being elected as Benton County Treasurer, Duane was the Chief Financial Accountant for the county. Earlier in his career, as auditor for the Washington State Auditor’s Office, he served as the Assistant Audit Manager in the Tri-Cities in charge of the Walla Walla regional offices.

State Treasurer
Davidson was elected state treasurer by winning 58% of the statewide vote against another Republican.

Davidson has said his agenda as State Treasurer includes emphasizing financial education for consumers, and particularly students. In a May, 2017 visit to the Yakima, Wash. area, he visited a Junior Achievement program focusing on financial education and emphasized the utility of successful learning models already in use, rather than the development of new curricula by state agencies.

Davidson has raised concerns about Washington state's total outstanding debt, and annual debt service costs. The state’s total outstanding obligations at the close of FY 2019 totaled $21.3 billion. He issues an annual report electronically by the request of the Legislature to each legislative member to provide an overview on the state's debt portfolio. While a county treasurer, Davidson served three terms as president of the Washington State Association of County Treasurers (WSACT) and earlier served as the organization’s treasurer.

State Representative Campaign
On March 2, 2021, Davidson announced his candidacy for the Washington House of Representatives in the 8th district. This seat is being vacated by Representative Brad Klippert who is retiring to challenge U.S. Representative Dan Newhouse in the 4th district. In March 2022, Davidson dropped out of the State Representative race in an effort to focus on his family and community.

Personal life
He and his wife Kathy (deceased 2016), had three children, Bailey (Justin Young), Luke (Tanisha) and Grace (Preston). Davidson is a long-time Kiwanian. He is the past-president for two separate Kiwanis Clubs in the Tri-Cities and served as treasurer for the Kiwanis Club of Tri-Cities Industry Foundation.

Electoral history

References

External links

1959 births
21st-century American politicians
American accountants
Central Washington University alumni
Living people
People from Benton County, Washington
People from Carnation, Washington
State treasurers of Washington (state)
Washington (state) Republicans